The Arkadelphia Confederate Monument is located on the grounds of the Clark County Courthouse in Arkadelphia, Arkansas.  The sculpture, which depicts a Confederate Army soldier, was carved from Italian marble, and is mounted on a base of Georgia marble.  It was designed and executed by R. P. Phillips in 1911, with funding from the local chapter of the United Daughters of the Confederacy.

The monument was listed on the National Register of Historic Places in 1996.

See also

National Register of Historic Places listings in Clark County, Arkansas

References

Buildings and structures completed in 1911
Buildings and structures in Arkadelphia, Arkansas
Monuments and memorials on the National Register of Historic Places in Arkansas
National Register of Historic Places in Clark County, Arkansas
Neoclassical architecture in Arkansas
United Daughters of the Confederacy monuments and memorials in Arkansas
1911 establishments in Arkansas